Wellington-Karori is a former New Zealand parliamentary electorate in the Wellington region, which existed for one parliamentary term from 1993 to 1996, and was held by Pauline Gardiner. In 1995, Gardiner defected from National to United New Zealand.

Population centres
Based on the 1991 New Zealand census, an electoral redistribution was carried out. This resulted in the abolition of nine electorates, and the creation of eleven new electorates. Through an amendment in the Electoral Act in 1965, the number of electorates in the South Island was fixed at 25, so the new electorates increased the number of the North Island electorates by two. In the South Island, one electorate was abolished and one electorate was recreated. In the North Island, five electorates were newly created (including Wellington-Karori), five electorates were recreated, and eight electorates were abolished.

The electorate covered the central section and some suburbs of the city of Wellington. Polling booths were in Chartwell, Wellington Central, Crofton Downs, Highbury, Karori, Kelburn, Khandallah, Mākara, Ngaio, Northland, Thorndon, Wadestown, and Wilton.

History

Gardiner had contested the  electorate for the National Party in the  against Fran Wilde, the incumbent of the Labour Party. On election night, Gardiner had a lead, but Wilde won when the special votes had been counted. Wilde was elected Mayor of Wellington in 1992, and her resignation from parliament caused the 1992 Wellington Central by-election. Gardiner was beaten by Labour's Chris Laidlaw by a vote margin of just over 1%. In the 1993 election, Gardiner in turn defeated Laidlaw when they contested the new Wellington-Karori electorate. In 1995, Gardiner left the National Party to join six other MPs in the establishment of United New Zealand, a centrist party. Like all United MPs but Peter Dunne, she was defeated in the 1996 election; she contested the Wellington Central electorate, where she came fourth.

Members of Parliament
Key

1Pauline Gardiner defected to United New Zealand in 1995.

Election results

1993 election

References

Historical electorates of New Zealand
Politics of the Wellington Region
1993 establishments in New Zealand
1996 disestablishments in New Zealand